The 1964 Allan Cup was the Canadian senior ice hockey championship for the 1963–64 senior "A" season.  The event was hosted by the Winnipeg Maroons and Winnipeg, Manitoba.  The 1964 playoff marked the 56th time that the Allan Cup was awarded.

Teams
Woodstock Athletics (Eastern Canadian Champions)
Winnipeg Maroons (Western Canadian Champions)

Playdowns

Allan Cup Best-of-Seven Series
Winnipeg Maroons 5 - Woodstock Athletics 0
Winnipeg Maroons 7 - Woodstock Athletics 1
Winnipeg Maroons 5 - Woodstock Athletics 0
Winnipeg Maroons 5 - Woodstock Athletics 3

Eastern Playdowns
Quarter-final
Windsor Maple Leafs defeated Montreal Boisclair 3-games-to-none
Windsor Maple Leafs 11 - Montreal Boisclair 2
Windsor Maple Leafs 7 - Montreal Boisclair 1
Windsor Maple Leafs 11 - Montreal Boisclair 4
Semi-final
Woodstock Athletics defeated Rouyn-Noranda Alouettes 4-games-to-1
Rouyn-Noranda Alouettes 6 - Woodstock Athletics 4
Woodstock Athletics 5 - Rouyn-Noranda Alouettes 2
Woodstock Athletics 6 - Rouyn-Noranda Alouettes 5
Woodstock Athletics 7 - Rouyn-Noranda Alouettes 5
Woodstock Athletics 6 - Rouyn-Noranda Alouettes 2
Ottawa Montagnards defeated Windsor Maple Leafs 3-games-to-2
Windsor Maple Leafs 4 - Ottawa Montagnards 3
Ottawa Montagnards 7 - Windsor Maple Leafs 4
Ottawa Montagnards 5 - Windsor Maple Leafs 4
Windsor Maple Leafs 5 - Ottawa Montagnards 2
Ottawa Montagnards 7 - Windsor Maple Leafs 4
Final
Woodstock Athletics defeated Ottawa Montagnards 4-games-to-none
Woodstock Athletics 7 - Ottawa Montagnards 2
Woodstock Athletics 10 - Ottawa Montagnards 1
Woodstock Athletics 6 - Ottawa Montagnards 2
Woodstock Athletics 8 - Ottawa Montagnards 5

Western Playdowns
Quarter-final
Kimberley Dynamiters defeated Lacombe Rockets 3-games-to-2
Lacombe Rockets 5 - Kimberley Dynamiters 3
Lacombe Rockets 7 - Kimberley Dynamiters 5
Kimberley Dynamiters 7 - Lacombe Rockets 2
Kimberley Dynamiters 8 - Lacombe Rockets 5
Kimberley Dynamiters 7 - Lacombe Rockets 4 
Semi-final
Saskatoon Quakers defeated Kimberley Dynamiters 4-games-to-none
Saskatoon Quakers 8 - Kimberley Dynamiters 1
Saskatoon Quakers 6 - Kimberley Dynamiters 1
Saskatoon Quakers 5 - Kimberley Dynamiters 4
Saskatoon Quakers 5 - Kimberley Dynamiters 4
Winnipeg Maroons defeated Port Arthur Bearcats 4-games-to-none
Winnipeg Maroons 6 - Port Arthur Bearcats 3
Winnipeg Maroons 5 - Port Arthur Bearcats 3
Winnipeg Maroons 8 - Port Arthur Bearcats 3
Winnipeg Maroons 9 - Port Arthur Bearcats 0
Final
Winnipeg Maroons defeated Saskatoon Quakers 4-games-to-1
Winnipeg Maroons 6 - Saskatoon Quakers 1
Winnipeg Maroons 7 - Saskatoon Quakers 5
Winnipeg Maroons 5 - Saskatoon Quakers 4
Saskatoon Quakers 7 - Winnipeg Maroons 5
Winnipeg Maroons 6 - Saskatoon Quakers 2

External links
Allan Cup archives 
Allan Cup website

Allan Cup
Allan
Allan Cup 1964